A thyrsus is a staff of giant fennel covered with ivy vines and leaves.

Thyrsus may also refer to:
 Thyrsus (grasshopper), a genus of grasshopper in the family Tetrigidae
 Thyrsus (giant) a mythical figure from Austria
 Saint Thyrsus (died 251), Christian martyr
 Thyrsus (Mage: the Awakening), a Mage character
 Thyrsus González de Santalla (1624-1705), Spanish theologian

See also

 Thyrsis (disambiguation)
 Thyrse, a flowering plant structure called thyrsus in botanical Latin

Masculine given names

pl:Tyrs